McCullum Creek is a stream in Barton County in the U.S. state of Missouri.

McCullum Creek has the name of the local McCullum family of settlers.

See also
List of rivers of Missouri

References

Rivers of Barton County, Missouri
Rivers of Missouri